Korea Biomedical Review, abbreviated as KBR,  is a South Korea-based online English-language newspaper that mainly delivers news related to the field of healthcare in the Republic of Korea. 

Korea Biomedical Review is the first English newspaper in South Korea focusing on the healthcare field,  and its ISO 4 abbreviation is Korea Biomed. Rev..

The newspaper's official website domain name, koreabiomed.com,  was registered on October 7, 2016. The first issue of Korea Biomedical Review was released on 22 February 2017 as a sister paper to its Korean version, the Korean Doctors' Weekly.

References

South Korean news websites
Publications established in 2017
Newspapers published in South Korea
English-language newspapers published in South Korea